Dwarf tarantulas, also known as sheet funnel-web spiders are a type of spider from the family Mecicobothriidae. Dwarf tarantulas are one of several families of the suborder Mygalomorphae; this larger group also includes the true tarantulas.

Description
Dwarf tarantulas, as the name indicates, appear very similar to tarantulas, but are physically much smaller. Many specimens are smaller than 1 cm in length, and the largest in the family are seldom larger than 2 cm. The spiders, like all Mygalomorphae, have downward pointing fangs; dwarf tarantulas also have long spinnerets.

Genera
There is currently only 1 recognized genus in this family:

Mecicobothrium Holmberg, 1882
 Mecicobothrium baccai Lucas et al., 2006 — Brazil
 Mecicobothrium thorelli Holmberg, 1882 — Argentina, Uruguay

Genera moved to other families include:
Hexura Simon, 1884 → Antrodiaetidae
Hexurella Gertsch & Platnick, 1979 → Hexurellidae
Megahexura Kaston, 1972 → Megahexuridae

See also
 Spider families

References

 Costa, F.G. & Pérez-Miles, F. (1998). Behavior, life cycle, and webs of Mecicobothrium thorelli, The Journal of Arachnology 26:317-329 PDF
Gertsch, W.G. & Platnick, N.I. (1979). A revision of the spider family Mecicobothriidae (Araneae, Mygalomorphae).  American Museum Novitates 2687 PDF (14Mb) - Abstract
 

Mygalomorphae
Spiders of South America
Spiders of North America
Taxa named by Eduardo Ladislao Holmberg